David Verdú López (born 25 September 1988) is a Spanish footballer who last played for AEL in the Greek Football League as a centre forward.

External links
 
 Crimson Scorer
 

1988 births
Living people
Spanish footballers
Expatriate footballers in Greece
Association football forwards
Athlitiki Enosi Larissa F.C. players